Vice Admiral Arthur Kemmis Betty DSO (1877 – 1961) was a senior Royal Navy officer.

Naval career
Born in 1877, Arthur Kemmis Betty was educated at Bedford School and at the training ship Britannia. He was promoted to the rank of Commander on 30 June 1912, and served during the First World War. In February 1915 he was appointed Flag Commander to Admiral Sir Frederick Hamilton at Rosyth and, in 1917, he was awarded the Distinguished Service Order. Between June 1917 and November 1918 he was War Staff Officer to Admiral Sir Charles Madden aboard . He was promoted to the rank of captain on 30 June 1918 and assumed command of the light cruiser  in April 1919. He commanded the 1st Destroyer Flotilla between 1920 and 1922, and took command of the battleship  in 1923. He was appointed as aide-de-camp to King George V in 1929.

Arthur Kemmis Betty was promoted to the rank of rear admiral in 1929 and to the rank of vice admiral in 1934. He died in Eastbourne on 11 May 1961, aged 83.

References

1877 births
1961 deaths
People educated at Bedford School
Graduates of Britannia Royal Naval College
Royal Navy vice admirals
Companions of the Distinguished Service Order
Royal Navy personnel of World War I